Indian Broadcasting Foundation also known as (IBF) is a unified representative body of the television broadcasters in India. The organisation was founded in the year 1999. Over 250 Indian television channels are associated with it. The organisation is credited as the spokesman of India Broadcasting Industry.

Objectives
The IBF is the parent organisation of the Broadcasting Content Complaints Council (BCCC) which was set up in the year 2011. The BCCC examines content-related complaints relating to all non-news general entertainment channels in India.

References

Broadcasting